James Stuart "Jim" Mather (born 6 March 1947) is a former Scottish National Party (SNP) politician.  He was the Minister for Enterprise, Energy and Tourism from 2007 to 2011, and he was a Member of the Scottish Parliament (MSP) from 2003 to 2011. He was the SNP's National Treasurer for four years and after leaving Parliament has held various non-executive posts and academic roles.

Early life
Mather was born in Lochwinnoch and was educated at Paisley Grammar School and Greenock High School before attending the University of Glasgow. Prior to his election to Holyrood he worked as a chartered accountant and ran his own business.

Political career
He joined the SNP in 1996 and was the SNP's National Treasurer from 2000.

He is credited with making and presenting the economic case for Scottish Independence, having taken the argument to the media, boardrooms and committee rooms across Scotland between 2001 and 2007.

He was the SNP candidate in the 2000 Ayr by-election and was their candidate for Argyll and Bute at the 2003 election. That latter election saw him elected to the Scottish Parliament as a regional list member for the Highlands and Islands. In opposition he was the SNP's Shadow Enterprise and Economy Minister.

Mather contested Argyll and Bute again at the 2007 Scottish Parliament Election and was successful, winning the seat from George Lyon of the Scottish Liberal Democrats.

After the SNP's victory at the 2007 Scottish Parliament Election, Mather was appointed Minister for Enterprise, Energy and Tourism and held that post for 4 years until the end of the 2011 parliament.

After Parliament
Jim Mather stood down as an MSP at the 2011 election.

In 2014, he chaired the Scottish Government's Working Together Review, which was asked to produce a report with recommendations that would help create many more progressive and collegiate workplaces in Scotland. That report was well-received and contributed to the creation of a Cabinet role that covers Fair Work and a Fair Work Convention.

In December 2014 he was announced as chairman of the trade body Homes for Scotland, formally taking up the three-year part-time position in May 2015. He stood down by mutual agreement on 12 May 2017.

Mather is currently a visiting professor with the University of Strathclyde and Heriot-Watt University and fulfils other consultancy and speaking roles.

References

External links 
 

1947 births
Living people
Members of the Scottish Parliament 2003–2007
Scottish National Party MSPs
People from Renfrewshire
Scottish accountants
People educated at Paisley Grammar School
Alumni of the University of Glasgow
Academics of the University of Strathclyde
Academics of Heriot-Watt University
Members of the Scottish Parliament 2007–2011